The Last September is a 1999 British drama film directed by Deborah Warner and produced by Yvonne Thunder from a screenplay by John Banville. It is based on the 1929 novel of the same name by Elizabeth Bowen. The film stars an ensemble cast, which includes Maggie Smith, Michael Gambon, Keeley Hawes, David Tennant and Lambert Wilson. It was filmed in Dowth Hall, County Meath along the banks of the River Boyne.

Plot
Set in the early 1920s, Anglo-Irish landowners Sir Richard and Lady Myra Naylor reside in their country estate with their high-spirited niece, Lois, and their nephew Laurence during the twilight of British rule in southern Ireland. They are joined by the Montmorencys who hide the fact that they are presently homeless. Lois is being courted by a British officer stationed in Ireland during the Irish War of Independence. The arrival of Marda Norton causes an upheaval amongst all in the house as does an escaped commander of the Irish Volunteers who is on the run from local British soldiers and police.

Cast
Maggie Smith as Lady Myra
Michael Gambon as Sir Richard Naylor
Keeley Hawes as Lois Farquar
David Tennant as Gerald Colthurst
Lambert Wilson as Hugo Montmorency
Jane Birkin as Francie Montmorency
Fiona Shaw as Marda Norton
Jonathan Slinger as Laurence Carstairs
Richard Roxburgh as Daventry
Tom Hickey as O'Brien
Gary Lydon as Peter Connolly
Emily Nagle as Livvy Connolly
Lesley McGuire as Mrs. Vermont

Reception
Writing for The New York Times, A. O. Scott noted Warner's direction "struggles against the arch politesse that too often characterizes the genre. She plunges into the forest with a hand-held camera and shoots her characters through windows, door frames and even the wrong end of a telescope in a heroic effort to trouble the placid surface of their lives, and to make her film resemble something other than an episode of Masterpiece Theater." Movie critic Roger Ebert gave the film two stars and wrote "The weakness of the movie is that these characters are more important as types than as people... The movie is elegantly mounted, and the house is represented in loving detail... I'm not sure the movie should have pumped up the melodrama to get us more interested, but something might have helped. Variety compared it to a "hard-edged 'Masterpiece Theater'". The movie received a score of 42% from 24 reviews on Rotten Tomatoes.

References

External links

1999 films
1999 drama films
British drama films
English-language Irish films
Films based on Irish novels
Films scored by Zbigniew Preisner
Films set in country houses
Films set in Ireland
Films set in the 1920s
Films shot in County Meath
Irish War of Independence films
Trimark Pictures films
1990s English-language films
1990s British films